Passiflora murucuja, the Virgin Islands passionflower, is a species in the family Passifloraceae. It is a fragrant Passion flower.

References

murucuja
Plants described in 1753
Taxa named by Carl Linnaeus